James Preller (born February 1, 1961) is an American writer of children's books including Bystander, Six Innings, and the Jigsaw Jones Mysteries.

He grew up in Wantagh, New York and went to college in Oneonta, New York.  After graduating from college in 1983, he worked as a waiter for one year before being hired as a copywriter by Scholastic Corporation. "Meeting" many notable children's writers through their books, he was inspired to try writing himself. His first book, MAXX TRAX: Avalanche Rescue, was published in 1986. Since then Preller has written a variety of books, some under pen names including Mitzy Kafka, James Patrick, and Izzy Bonkers. He lives in Delmar, New York, with his wife Lisa and their three children, Nicholas, Gavin, and Maggie. 
     
Preller up stories when he was young and sold them to friends, family, and neighbors. At that time, however, he planned to become a baseball player for the New York Mets.

Published books

Novels
 The Fox and the Hound, Scholastic, 1988
 The Iron Giant: A Novelization, Scholastic, 1999
 Six Innings (2008)
 Along Came Spider (2008)
 Bystander (2009)
 Justin Fisher Declares War!, Scholastic, 2010
 Before You Go, Feiwel & Friends, 2012
 The Fall (2015)
 The Courage Test (2016)
 Better Off Undead, Feiwel & Friends, 2017
 Blood Mountain, Feiwel & Friends, 2019
 Upstander (2021)

Scary Tales
Published by Feiwel & Friends.
 Home Sweet Horror, 2013
 I Scream, You Scream!, 2013
 Good Night, Zombie, 2013
 Nightmareland, 2014
 One-Eyed Doll, 2014
 Swamp Monster, 2015

Jigsaw Jones
Published by Scholastic Corporation.
 The Case of Hermie the Missing Hamster
 The Case of the Christmas Snowman
 The Case of the Secret Valentine
 The Case of the Spooky Sleepover
 The Case of the Stolen Baseball Cards
 The Case of the Mummy Mystery
 The Case of the Runaway Dog
 The Case of the Great Sled Race
 The Case of the Stinky Science Project
 The Case of the Ghostwriter
 The Case of the Marshmallow Monster
 The Case of the Class Clown
 The Case of the Detective in Disguise
 The Case of the Bicycle Bandit
 The Case of the Haunted Scarecrow
 The Case of the Sneaker Sneak
 The Case of the Disappearing Dinosaur
 The Case of the Bear Scare
 The Case of the Golden Key
 The Case of the Race Against Time
 The Case of the Rainy Day Mystery
 The Case of the Best Pet Ever
 The Case of the Perfect Prank
 The Case of the Glow-in-the-Dark Ghost
 The Case of the Vanishing Painting
 The Case of the Double Trouble Detectives
 The Case of the Frog-Jumping Contest
 The Case of the Food Fight
 The Case of the Skateboarding Superstar
 The Case of the Kidnapped Candy
 The Case of the Spoiled Rotten Spy
 The Case of the Groaning Ghost
 The Case of the Hat Burglar

Picture books

External links
 
 James Preller, author, at publisher Macmillan
 Feiwel & Friends, children's imprint at Macmillan 
 Biography, books, and "author visits" at publisher Scholastic
 
 

1961 births
American children's writers
American horror writers
American mystery writers
People from Wantagh, New York
Living people
American male novelists